Longnes may refer to the following places in France:

 Longnes, Sarthe, a commune in the Sarthe department
 Longnes, Yvelines, a commune in the Yvelines department